Wilson Timothy Sitshebo was the Anglican Bishop of Matabeleland until his death of a stroke in 2008. Born in 1952 and educated at St Bede’s College, Umtata, he was ordained deacon in 1979 and priest in 1980. After positions in Zimbabwe posts he was a tutor at the United College of the Ascension Selly Oak before his ordination to the episcopate in 2001. He was awarded a PhD in  2000 in the Faculty of Arts of the University of Birmingham for a dissertation titled "Towards a theological synthesis of Christian and Shona views of death and the dead: implications for pastoral care in the Anglican diocese of Harare, Zimbabwe."

Notes

1952 births
2008 deaths
Anglican bishops of Matabeleland
21st-century Anglican bishops in Africa